Greene County Career and Technology Center is a comprehensive career and technical school serving students from five school districts and their respective high schools in Greene County. The school is centrally-located in the county, in Franklin Township, just east of Waynesburg.

School districts and high schools

References

Schools in Greene County, Pennsylvania
Public high schools in Pennsylvania